Juan Emilio Mojica (born April 30, 1962) is a Dominican Republic professional football manager. From 2000 to 2002 and from January 2008 to December 2009 he coached Dominican Republic national football team.

References

External links
Profile at Soccerway.com
Profile at Soccerpunter.com

1962 births
Living people
Dominican Republic football managers
Dominican Republic national football team managers
Place of birth missing (living people)